Frederick H. Piehl (May 16, 1880 in Seymour, Wisconsin – February 16, 1939 in Rhinelander, Wisconsin) was a pioneer Oneida County, Wisconsin resident and a prominent figure in local business and public life. Piehl was a member of the county board of supervisors for 11 years. He was a member of Rhinelander's first city council under the city manager form of government. As a member of the county board, he represented the fourth ward of the city. He was the chairman of the audit and towns and villages committees of the board, and was a member of the forestry and conservation committee.

Piehl operated the Gagen Land and Cedar company in Piehl, Wisconsin and the Northern Cedar and Lumber Company.

References 

1880 births
1939 deaths
People from Seymour, Wisconsin
People from Rhinelander, Wisconsin
People from Oneida County, Wisconsin